Johannes Lippius (24 June 1585 – 24 September 1612) was an Alsatian theologian and music theorist. He coined the term "harmonic triad" in his Synopsis musicae novae (Synopsis of New Music; 1612).

Life
Lippius was born in Strasbourg, the son of the pastor of St. Peter, Johann Lippius (1554–1622), and his wife Susanna Klehmann. In early childhood, he had already received education in languages and the seven liberal arts, which allowed him to be appointed at the University of Strasbourg to the Master of Philosophy at a young age. By his twenty-first birthday he had given private and university lectures, after which he entered the University of Leipzig, 1606, the University of Wittenberg, the University of Frankfurt (Oder), the University of Jena, where he became adjunct of the faculty of philosophy, and the University of Erfurt. He died in Speyer, aged 27.

References

Further reading
 
 
 
 

1585 births
1612 deaths
German classical composers
Renaissance composers
17th-century German theologians
German philosophers
Musicians from Strasbourg
German music theorists
German male non-fiction writers
German male classical composers
17th-century German writers
17th-century German male writers